Roberto Clemente Stadium (Spanish: Estadio Roberto Clemente) is a multi-purpose stadium in Carolina, Puerto Rico.  It is currently used mostly for baseball games and is the home of Gigantes de Carolina.  The stadium holds 12,500 people and was built in 2000.  It is named after former Puerto Rican baseball great and native of Carolina, Roberto Clemente.

It hosted the 2007 Caribbean Series. From 2008 it is the home of the Gigantes de Carolina (football club) who plays in the Puerto Rico Soccer League.

References

External links
 Estadio Roberto Clemente on Google Earth Placemark
 Video about Stadium in 2006 on YouTube

2000 establishments in Puerto Rico
Baseball venues in Puerto Rico
Carolina, Puerto Rico
Football venues in Puerto Rico
Multi-purpose stadiums in the United States